Vaporetto 13 is a mystery novel set mainly in Venice, Italy, by Robert Girardi. The title refers to the Vaporetto, which is a motorized water taxi commonly used in Venice, Italy.

Plot
Jack Squire is a currency trader from Washington, D.C. on assignment to Venice, where he discovers both the light and dark of the city.  Caterina is the girl from Venice who haunts Jack Squire.

Publishing history
Published by a Delacorte in 1997, the third of four by Girardi that they carried.

References

1997 American novels
American mystery novels
Novels set in Venice